Prior to its uniform adoption of proportional representation in 1999, the United Kingdom used first-past-the-post for the European elections in England, Scotland and Wales. The European Parliament constituencies used under that system were smaller than the later regional constituencies and only had one Member of the European Parliament each.

The constituency of Staffordshire West and Congleton was one of them.

It consisted of the Westminster Parliament constituencies (on their 1983 boundaries) of Congleton, Newcastle-under-Lyme, South Staffordshire, Stafford, Stoke-on-Trent Central, Stoke-on-Trent North, and Stoke-on-Trent South.

Michael Tappin of the Labour Party was this constituency's only MEP.

MEPs

Election results

References

External links
David Boothroyd's United Kingdom Election Results

European Parliament constituencies in England (1979–1999)
Politics of Staffordshire
Politics of Cheshire
1994 establishments in England
1999 disestablishments in England
Constituencies established in 1994
Constituencies disestablished in 1999